Christopher George Arthur Collier (23 August 1886 – 25 August 1916) was an English cricketer: a right-handed batsman and right arm slow bowler who played 53 first-class matches in the years before the First World War. 52 of these were for Worcestershire, with the one exception being the match he played for H. K. Foster's XI in 1912. In all he scored 1,021 runs at 12.92 and took ten wickets at 36.90.

Collier's first-class debut came against Warwickshire at Worcester in mid-May 1910. He did little with the bat, scoring 10 and 2, and did not bowl.
Indeed, he did not send down a single ball in first-class cricket that season.
His first wicket, in late May 1911, was that of Oxford University's opener Richard Twining, and he finished with five in the match.

He played fairly frequently for Worcestershire over the following three years, turning out in 45 matches between 1911 and 1914. He also played one match for H. K. Foster's XI against Oxford University in 1912, in which he claimed a career-best 3/28 in the first innings.
Later that same summer, Collier also made his only half-century, hitting 72 for Worcestershire against Hampshire.
He also occasionally acted as scorer when not playing.

During World War I he served a staff sergeant in the Royal Army Ordnance Corps and was killed in action in the Battle of the Somme near Mametz, France, two days after his 30th birthday.

Notes

References
 
 
 Statistical summary from CricketArchive

1886 births
1916 deaths
British Army personnel of World War I
British military personnel killed in the Battle of the Somme
Cricketers from Banff, Aberdeenshire
English cricketers
Royal Army Ordnance Corps soldiers
Worcestershire cricketers
Scottish military personnel